Zhang Hongjiang (born 13 June 1997) is a Chinese footballer who plays for Chongqing Liangjiang.

Club career
Zhang Hongjiang joined Portuguese Second Division side Gondomar from Dalian Transcendence in 2016. He was officially promoted to the first team squad in the summer of 2016 before making his debut in a league game against S.C. Salgueiros on 29 January 2017 in a 3-1 defeat. 

In 2017, Zhang was loaned to China League One side Meizhou Hakka. In 2018, Zhang permanently transferred to Meizhou Hakka. In his first permanent full season at the club he would personally go on to win Young Player of the Season award at the end of the 2018 China League One season.

Career statistics
.

References

External links
Zhang Hongjiang at Soccerway

1997 births
Living people
Chinese footballers
Association football defenders
Footballers from Dalian
Dalian Transcendence F.C. players
Meizhou Hakka F.C. players
China League Two players
China League One players
Segunda Divisão players
Chinese expatriate footballers
Expatriate footballers in Portugal
Chinese expatriate sportspeople in Portugal